Centromere protein O is a protein that in humans is encoded by the CENPO gene. CENPO is involved in cell proliferation and cell cycle progression and has been shown to be down-regulated in trisomic neurospheres a mouse model of Down Syndrome, resulting in reduced numbers of neural progenitors and neuroblasts and a severe reduction in numbers of neurons produced.

References

External links

Further reading